Pirinen is a Finnish surname. Notable people with the surname include:

 Joakim Pirinen (born 1961), Swedish illustrator
 Jonna Pirinen (born 1982), Finnish singer-songwriter
 Juha Pirinen (born 1991), Finnish footballer
 Juho Pirinen (born 1995), Finnish ice skater
 Kauko Pirinen (1915–1999), Finnish historian

Finnish-language surnames